Jeisyville is a small village in Christian County, Illinois, United States. The population was 102 at the 2020 census.

Geography
Jeisyville is located at  (39.576344, -89.407493).

Demographics

As of the 2020 census there were 102 people, 28 households, and 15 families residing in the village. The racial makeup of the village was 90.20% White, 0.98% Asian, and 8.82% from two or more races. Hispanic or Latino of any race were 2.94% of the population.

There were 28 households, out of which 42.86% had children under the age of 18 living with them, 46.43% were married couples living together, 0.00% had a female householder with no husband present, and 46.43% were non-families. 32.14% of all households were made up of individuals, and 32.14% had someone living alone who was 65 years of age or older. The average household size was 2.73 and the average family size was 2.07.

The village's age distribution consisted of 20.7% under the age of 18, none from 18 to 24, 15.5% from 25 to 44, 15.5% from 45 to 64, and 48.3% who were 65 years of age or older. The median age was 58.8 years. For every 100 females, there were 123.1 males. For every 100 females age 18 and over, there were 155.6 males.

The median income for a household in the village was $67,500, and the median income for a family was $51,875. Males had a median income of $57,500 versus $45,313 for females. The per capita income for the village was $36,953. None of the population was below the poverty line.

References

Villages in Christian County, Illinois
Villages in Illinois